The Cello Concerto No. 1 is a composition for solo cello and orchestra by the Finnish composer Magnus Lindberg.  It was first performed in the Cité de la Musique, Paris on May 6, 1999 by the cellist Anssi Karttunen and the Orchestre de Paris under the direction of Esa-Pekka Salonen.

Composition
The cello concerto was composed between 1997 and 1999, though Magnus later revised the work in 2001.  The work is composed in one continuous movement and has a duration of roughly 25 minutes.

Instrumentation
The work is scored for a solo cello and an orchestra comprising two flutes (2nd doubling piccolo) two oboes, English horn, two clarinets, bass clarinet, two bassoons (2nd doubling contrabassoon), two horns, two trumpets, two trombones, tuba, timpani, percussion, harp, celesta, and strings.

Reception
The concerto has been praised by music critics.  Reviewing a 2002 recording of the work, BBC Music Magazine described the music as "another radical solution to the age-old challenges thrown up by this particular genre."  Gramophone compared the work favorably to Lindberg's Parada, writing:

The musicologist Arnold Whittall similarly described it as "one of the best contemporary music releases of that year."

Recording
A recording of the Cello Concerto, performed by Karttunen the Philharmonia Orchestra under Salonen, was released through Sony Classical Records in 2002.  The album also features Lindberg's Cantigas, Parada, and Fresco.

References

Concertos by Magnus Lindberg
1999 compositions
Lindberg 1